There have been 26 recorded tropical and subtropical cyclones in the North-eastern Pacific basin outside the official Pacific hurricane season. The National Hurricane Center (NHC) monitors the area from North America westward to 140°W, while the Central Pacific Hurricane Center is from 140°W to the International Date Line, north of the equator. The National Oceanic and Atmospheric Administration (NOAA) currently defines the season as starting May 15 in the eastern Pacific and June 1 for the central Pacific and ending on November 30 for both regions in each calendar year. Occasionally, however, storms develop in late November and persist until December, such as Hurricane Nina of 1957.

Few off-season tropical cyclones in the east Pacific have affected land, and none of them have made landfall. Only Hurricane Nina caused both property damage and fatalities. However, after Tropical Storm Paka crossed the International Date Line, it intensified into a typhoon with winds equivalent to a Category 5 hurricane on the Saffir–Simpson hurricane wind scale. The most recent off-season storm is Tropical Storm Andres in mid-May 2021.

The beginning of HURDAT, the official Pacific hurricane database maintained by the NHC, is 1949. Since then, thirteen storms have occurred outside the official bounds of hurricane season in the eastern and central north Pacific, respectively. In addition, the CPHC reports nine off-season storms from 1900 to 1952 with another off-season tropical cyclone occurring in 1832.

Chronology

The wind speeds listed are maximum one-minute average sustained winds. The category refers to the intensity on the Saffir–Simpson hurricane wind scale; TS stands for tropical storm, and TD for tropical depression.

Impact and records
Several off-season tropical cyclones have affected land. Hurricane Nina in early December 1957 prompted evacuations in Hawaii and caused $100,000 (1957 USD) in damage in the state. The storm also killed four people and produced  waves. Hurricane Winnie in December 1983 caused minor rainfall in parts of Mexico. The unnamed tropical storm of 1996 was assumed to have killed two people when it sank a trimaran called the Solar Wind. After becoming a typhoon, Paka caused significant damage in the Marshall Islands, Guam, and the Northern Mariana Islands. Overall, Paka caused $580 million (1997 USD) in damage, enough to warrant retirement of the name. None of these impacting systems made landfall.

In the official east Pacific hurricane database, which dates back to 1949, the first storm to occur outside of the current season was Hurricane Nina in 1957. In the database, thirteen tropical cyclones have existed between December and May, most recently, Hurricane Pali in 2016. Tropical Storm Winona in January 1989 was not listed in the database, despite forming south of Hawaii. In addition, there were at least eight tropical cyclones before the start of the official database, many of which existed near Hawaii. Storms were most likely to occur in December, followed by January and May. Only one cyclone each was reported in the two months of March and April. Of all off-season tropical cyclones, the "Froc Cyclone" lasted longest, spanning 12 days and two calendar years. The year with the most off-season storms was tied between 1904 and 1992, with a total of two tropical cyclones. No Pacific hurricane season had both a pre-season and post-season storm.

Monthly statistics

See also

List of off-season Atlantic hurricanes
List of off-season Australian region tropical cyclones
List of off-season South Pacific tropical cyclones

References

Notes

 Off-season
Off-season